Orania fusulus, common name : the spindle dwarf triton, is a species of sea snail, a marine gastropod mollusk in the family Muricidae, the murex snails or rock snails.

Description
The shell varies between 10 mm and 22 mm

Distribution
This species is distributed in Western European waters, the Mediterranean Sea and in the Atlantic Ocean along Angola and Brazil.

References

 Gofas, S.; Le Renard, J.; Bouchet, P. (2001). Mollusca, in: Costello, M.J. et al. (Ed.) (2001). European register of marine species: a check-list of the marine species in Europe and a bibliography of guides to their identification. Collection Patrimoines Naturels, 50: pp. 180–213
 Sabelli B. & Tommasini S. (1983). Contributo alla conoscenza sistematica di "Murex" fusulus Brocchi, 1814. Bollettino Malacologico 19 (1–4): 1–12
 Gofas, S.; Afonso, J.P.; Brandào, M. (Ed.). (S.a.). Conchas e Moluscos de Angola = Coquillages et Mollusques d'Angola. [Shells and molluscs of Angola]. Universidade Agostinho / Elf Aquitaine Angola: Angola. 140 pp

External links
 Gastropods.com : Orania fusulus; accessed ; 28 December 2010

Gastropods described in 1814
Orania (gastropod)